The 2021–22 Northern Arizona Lumberjacks men's basketball team represented Northern Arizona University in the 2021–22 NCAA Division I men's basketball season. The Lumberjacks were led by third-year head coach Shane Burcar, and played their home games at the Rolle Activity Center in Flagstaff, Arizona as members of the Big Sky Conference. They finished the season 9–23, 5–15 in Big Sky play to finish in a tie for last place. As the No. 11 seed in the Big Sky tournament, they lost to Eastern Washington in the first round.

Previous season
In a season limited due to the ongoing COVID-19 pandemic, the Lumberjacks finished the 2020–21 season 6–16 overall, 4–10 in Big Sky play to finish in a tie for 10th place. In the Big Sky Conference tournament, they defeated Portland State in the first round before losing to Eastern Washington.

Offseason

Departures

Incoming transfers

2021 incoming recruits

2022 incoming recruits

Roster

Schedule and results

|-
!colspan=12 style=| Regular season

|-
!colspan=12 style=| Big Sky tournament

Source

References

Northern Arizona Lumberjacks men's basketball seasons
Northern Arizona Lumberjacks
Northern Arizona Lumberjacks men's basketball
Northern Arizona Lumberjacks men's basketball